Phonotactics (from Ancient Greek  "voice, sound" and  "having to do with arranging") is a branch of phonology that deals with restrictions in a language on the permissible combinations of phonemes. Phonotactics defines permissible syllable structure, consonant clusters and vowel sequences by means of phonotactic constraints.

Phonotactic constraints are highly language-specific. For example, in Japanese, consonant clusters like  do not occur.

Syllables have the following internal segmental structure:
 Onset (optional)
 Rhyme (obligatory, comprises nucleus and coda):
 Nucleus (obligatory)
 Coda (optional)

Both onset and coda may be empty, forming a vowel-only syllable, or alternatively, the nucleus can be occupied by a syllabic consonant. Phonotactics is known to affect second language vocabulary acquisition.

English phonotactics

The English syllable (and word) twelfths  is divided into the onset , the nucleus  and the coda ; thus, it can be described as CCVCCCC (C = consonant, V = vowel). On this basis it is possible to form rules for which representations of phoneme classes may fill the cluster. For instance, English allows at most three consonants in an onset, but among native words under standard accents (and excluding a few obscure loanwords such as sphragistics), phonemes in a three-consonantal onset are limited to the following scheme:

 + stop + approximant:
 +  + 
stream
 +  +  (not in most accents of American English)
stew
 +  + 
sputum
sprawl
splat
 +  + 
skew
scream
sclerosis
squirrel

Theoretically, this would produce . The cluster , however, infringes the constraint for three-consonantal onsets in English.

Not all languages have this constraint; compare Spanish   or French  .

Constraints on English phonotactics include:

 All syllables have a nucleus
 No geminate consonants
 No onset 
 No  in the syllable coda (except in Hiberno-English)
 The first consonant in a complex onset must be an obstruent (e.g. stop; combinations such as *ntat or *rkoop, with a sonorant, are not allowed)
 The second consonant in a complex onset must not be a voiced obstruent (e.g. *zdop does not occur)
 If the first consonant in a complex onset is not , the second must be a liquid or a glide
 Every subsequence contained within a sequence of consonants must obey all the relevant phonotactic rules (the substring principle rule)
 No glides in syllable codas (excluding the s of diphthongs)
 If the second consonant in a complex coda is voiced, so is the first
 Two obstruents in the same coda must share voicing (compare kids  with kits )

Sonority Sequencing Principle

Segments of a syllable are universally distributed following the Sonority Sequencing Principle (SSP), which states that, in any syllable, the nucleus has maximal sonority and that sonority decreases as you move away from the nucleus. Sonority is a measure of the amplitude of a speech sound. The particular ranking of each speech sound by sonority, called the sonority hierarchy, is language-specific, but, in its broad lines, hardly varies from a language to another, which means all languages form their syllables in approximately the same way with regards to sonority.

Hence slips  and pulse  are possible English words while *lsips and *pusl are not.

The SSP expresses a very strong cross-linguistic tendency, however, it does not account for the patterns of all complex syllable margins, as there are both initial as well as final clusters violation the SSP, in two ways: the first occurs when two segments in a margin have the same sonority, which is known as a sonority plateau. Such margins are found in a few languages, including English, as in the words sphinx and fact (though note that phsinx and fatc both violate English phonotactics).

The second instance of violation of the SSP is when a peripheral segment of a margin has a higher sonority than a segment closer to the nucleus. These margins are known as reversals and occur in some languages including English (steal  , bets  ) or French (  but originally).

Notes and references

Notes

References
 Bailey, Todd M. & Hahn, Ulrike. 2001. Determinants of wordlikeness: Phonotactics or lexical neighborhoods? Journal of Memory and Language 44: 568–591.
 Coleman, John S. & Pierrehumbert, Janet. 1997. Stochastic phonological grammars and acceptability. Computational Phonology 3: 49–56.
 Frisch, S.; Large, N. R.; & Pisoni, D. B. 2000. Perception of wordlikeness: Effects of segment probability and length on processing non-words. Journal of Memory and Language 42: 481–496.
 Gathercole, Susan E. & Martin, Amanda J. 1996. Interactive processes in phonological memory. In Cognitive models of memory, edited by Susan E. Gathercole. Hove, UK: Psychology Press.
 Hammond, Michael. 2004. Gradience, phonotactics, and the lexicon in English phonology. International Journal of English Studies 4: 1–24.
 Gaygen, Daniel E. 1997. Effects of probabilistic phonotactics on the segmentation of continuous speech. Doctoral dissertation, University at Buffalo, Buffalo, NY.
 Greenberg, Joseph H. & Jenkins, James J. 1964. Studies in the psychological correlates of the sound system of American English. Word 20: 157–177.
 
 Luce, Paul A. & Pisoni, Daniel B. 1998. Recognizing spoken words: The neighborhood activation model. Ear and Hearing 19: 1–36.
 Newman, Rochelle S.; Sawusch, James R.; & Luce, Paul A. 1996. Lexical neighborhood effects in phonetic processing. Journal of Experimental Psychology: Human Perception and Performance 23: 873–889.
 Ohala, John J. & Ohala, M. 1986. Testing hypotheses regarding the psychological manifestation of morpheme structure constraints. In Experimental phonology, edited by John J. Ohala & Jeri J. Jaeger, 239–252. Orlando, FL: Academic Press.
 Orzechowska, Paula; Wiese, Richard. 2015; Preferences and variation in word-initial phonotactics: a multi-dimensional evaluation of German and Polish. Folia Linguistica 49: 439-486.
 Pitt, Mark A. & McQueen, James M. 1998. Is compensation for coarticulation mediated by the lexicon? Journal of Memory and Language 39: 347–370.
 Storkel, Holly L. 2001. Learning new words: Phonotactic probability in language development. Journal of Speech, Language, and Hearing Research 44: 1321–1337.
 Storkel, Holly L. 2003. Learning new words II: Phonotactic probability in verb learning. Journal of Speech, Language, and Hearing Research 46: 1312–1323.
 Vitevitch, Michael S. & Luce, Paul A. 1998. When words compete: Levels of processing in perception of spoken words. Psychological Science 9: 325–329.
 Vitevitch, Michael S. & Luce, Paul A. 1999. Probabilistic phonotactics and neighborhood activation in spoken word recognition. Journal of Memory and Language 40: 374–408.
 Vitevitch, Michael S.; Luce, Paul A.; Charles-Luce, Jan; & Kemmerer, David. 1997. Phonotactics and syllable stress: Implications for the processing of spoken nonsense words. Language and Speech 40: 47–62.
 Vitevitch, Michael S.; Luce, Paul A.; Pisoni, David B.; & Auer, Edward T. 1999. Phonotactics, neighborhood activation, and lexical access for spoken words. Brain and Language 68: 306–311.

External links
 The Irvine Phonotactic Online Dictionary (IPhOD)
 World Phonotactics Database

 
Phonology